Cane Hollow is a valley in Douglas County in the Ozarks of southern Missouri.

The intermittent stream in the valley is spring fed. The valley source lies just south of County Road C-224 west of Missouri Route C. The stream flows south-southwest turning southwest and flowing parallel to Missouri Route 14. Just prior to its confluence it passes under Route 14 and enters Bryant Creek south of the Route 14 bridge and adjacent to a portion of the Rippee State Wildlife Management Area.

Cane Hollow was named for the canebrake the valley contained.

References

Valleys of Douglas County, Missouri
Valleys of Missouri